Stare Gnatowice  is a village in the administrative district of Gmina Kampinos, within Warsaw West County, Masovian Voivodeship, in eastcentral Poland.

The village has a population of 120.

References

Stare Gnatowice